Fifths tuning is a non-standard tuning for the double bass, used primarily in classical and jazz music. In this tuning, the double bass is tuned like a cello but an octave lower (C-G-D-A low to high). 

Although fifths tuning was once the most common double bass tuning in France in the 19th century, standard fourths tuning (E-A-D-G) has since become the most used tuning for the instrument. Fifths has recently been repopularised by a small but increasing number of bassists, most notably American Red Mitchell and Canadian Joel Quarrington who now is Principal in the London Symphony. Other players who use the tuning include Dennis Masuzzo, Silvio Dalla Torre, Paul Unger, Larry Holloway and Tomoya Aomori. Although still relatively uncommon (most fifths players are in Canada), its popularity is ever increasing.

Its advocates say the advantages of fifths tuning are:
Increased resonance, volume and quality of sound (the strings have more common overtones, causing the strings to vibrate sympathetically).
Superior intonation with the rest of the string section due to the uniform tuning (for classical players).
Best method of obtaining a low C, without an extension or a fifth string.
Mostly used by jazz players for the major tenth which can be played easily without a position shift.

See also
Double bass
Joel Quarrington
Red Mitchell
Circle of fifths

References

Double basses
Musical tuning